Aisslinger is a surname. Notable people with the surname include:

 Werner Aisslinger (born 1964), German furniture designer
 Horst Aisslinger (1925–1992), German philatelist